Simon Zhu Kaimin (30 October 1868 - 22 February 1960) was a Chinese Roman Catholic Bishop of Roman Catholic Diocese of Jiangsu, China.

Name
His given name is Ximeng. His Zi is Mingde. His Hao is Jiqiu and Kaimin.

Biography
Zhu was born in Shanghai, on October 30, 1868 to a fisherman's family. His ancestral home in Qingpu County, Jiangsu Province. His ancestor Ma Tingluan was the prime minister of the Southern Song. Their family has believed in Catholicism since the Ming dynasty. His mother Ma Jianshu was the elder sister of Ma Xiangbo, founder of Fudan University. 

In 1883 he studied Latin at the Dongjiadu Catholic Church and then studied theology at Xujiahui Catholic Church. He joined the Society of Jesus on September 9, 1888. He was ordained a priest on June 28, 1898.

On August 2, 1926, he was appointed bishop of the Roman Catholic Diocese of Haimen by the Pope Pius XI. On October 28, 1926, he and five other Chinese priests (Odoric Cheng Hede, Philippus Zhao Huaiyi, Hu Ruoshan, Melchior Sun Dezhen, and Chen Guodi) were ordained bishops by Pope Pius XI in Rome. Then they had traveled to France, Belgium and other countries.

He returned to China in March 1927 and founded Xilei Middle School that same year.

During the Second Sino-Japanese War, he actively raised funds to support the fight against the Empire of Japan.

At the beginning of 1949, he lived in Shanghai. He returned to Haimen in 1955. In 1958 Matthew Yu Chengcai was proposed as the new bishop of the Roman Catholic Diocese of Haimen, Zhu reported the result to the Holy See. On January 15, 1959, Zhu was labeled as a rightist by the Communist government. Zhu was brought to be persecuted and suffered political persecution. On November 15, 1959, Matthew Yu Chengcai was consecrated as bishop of the Roman Catholic Diocese of Haimen in Nanjing, but it was not recognized by the Holy See. 

Zhu died of illness on February 22, 1960. He was buried in the Tomb of Yuangongsuo. In 1966, Mao Zedong launched the Cultural Revolution, his tomb was completely destroyed by the Red Guards. He was rehabilitated on May 15, 1980.

References

1868 births
People from Shanghai
1960 deaths
20th-century Roman Catholic bishops in China
Victims of the Anti-Rightist Campaign